Comhaltan Ua Clerigh was King of Uí Fiachrach Aidhne, fl. 964/966-978.

Sub anno 966, the Chronicon Scotorum states:

A defeat was inflicted on ua Ruairc in Boirenn of Corcu Mruad by Comaltán grandson of Cléirech and by Mael Sechnaill son of Argda, in which 4000 fell, including Taichlech ua Gadra, i.e. king of Luigne.

The much later Annals of the Four Masters date the incident to 964, stating: 

A victory was gained by Comhaltan Ua Cleirigh, i.e. lord of Ui-Fiachrach-Aidhne, and by Maelseachlainn, son of Arcda, over Fearghal Ua Ruairc, where seven hundred were lost, together with Toichleach Ua Gadhra, lord of South Luighne.

Under the year 978, Chronicon Scotorum states Comaltán ua Cléirigh, king of Uí Fhiachrach of Aidne, dies.

References 
 Irish Kings and High-Kings, Francis John Byrne (2001), Dublin: Four Courts Press, 
 Annals of Ulster at CELT: Corpus of Electronic Texts at University College Cork

People from County Galway
10th-century Irish monarchs
978 deaths
Gaels
Year of birth unknown